Ingeniero Luis A. Huergo is a village and municipality in Río Negro Province in Argentina.

Notable people
Aimé Painé (1943—1987), an Argentine singer of Mapuche and Tehuelche origin

References

Populated places in Río Negro Province